"Martika's Kitchen" is the second single and title track released from American singer-songwriter and actress Martika's 1991 album of the same name, written and produced by Prince. Although it did not replicate the success of "Love... Thy Will Be Done" in the United States, stalling at number 93 on the Billboard Hot 100 (her last song to feature on that chart), it was more successful internationally, peaking within the top 30 in Australia, Ireland, New Zealand, Sweden and the United Kingdom.

Charts

References

Martika songs
1991 singles
1991 songs
Columbia Records singles
Number-one singles in Zimbabwe
Songs written by Prince (musician)
Song recordings produced by Prince (musician)